Miron Białoszewski (born 30 June 1922, Warsaw; died 17 June 1983, Warsaw) was a Polish poet, novelist, playwright and actor.

Biography
Białoszewski studied linguistics at the clandestine courses of the University of Warsaw during the German occupation of Poland. Following the end of the Warsaw Uprising, he was sent to a labour camp in the Third Reich, and returned to Warsaw at the end of World War II.

First, he worked at the central post office, and then as a journalist for a number of popular magazines, some of them for children. In 1955 Białoszewski took part in the foundation of a small theatre called Teatr na Tarczyńskiej, where he premiered his plays Wiwisekcja and Osmędeusze, and acted in them with Ludmiła Murawska. In the same year Białoszewski debuted in Życie literackie along with another renowned Polish poet and his contemporary, Zbigniew Herbert. Białoszewski was gay and for many years, he shared an apartment at Pl. Dąbrowskiego 7 with his live-in partner, the painter Leszek Soliński.

According to Joanna Nizynska from University of California in Los Angeles: 

His highly acclaimed memoir, Pamiętnik z powstania warszawskiego ("Memoir of the Warsaw Uprising") was published in 1970 (and translated into English in 1977). In it, Białoszewski gave a philosophical account of his wartime experiences 27 years after the fact. In 1982 he was awarded the Jurzykowski Prize by the New York-based Alfred Jurzykowski Foundation. He died of a heart attack on 17 June 1983. There is a large body of literature devoted to the critical analysis of Białoszewski's works - most notably by such writers and academics as Czesław Miłosz, Maria Janion, Stanisław Barańczak, Jan Błoński, Kazimierz Wyka and Artur Sandauer.

Works
The number given between square brackets after each book title and year of publication refers to the volume of Białoszewski's Collected Works (Utwory zebrane, Warsaw: Państwowy Instytut Wydawniczy 1987) in which the texts published originally in these books have been reprinted.

Poetry
Obroty rzeczy (1956) 
Rachunek zachciankowy (1959) 
Mylne wzruszenia (1961) 
Było i było (1965) 
Wiersze (1976) 
Poezje wybrane (1976) 
Miron Białoszewski  [in the series Poeci Polscy ] (1977) 
Odczepić się (1978) 
Wiersze wybrane i dobrane (1980) 
Trzydzieści lat wierszy (1982) 
Oho (1985)

Poetry and Prose
Teatr Osobny (1973) 
Rozkurz (1980) 
Stara proza i nowe wiersze (1984) 
Obmapywanie Europy. Aaameryka. Ostatnie wiersze (1988 – posthumously)

Prose
Pamiętnik z powstania warszawskiego) (1970) English translation by Madeline Levine: A Memoir of the Warsaw Uprising  (1977, 1991)
Donosy rzeczywistości (1973) 
Szumy, zlepy, ciągi (1976) 
Zawał (1977) 
Przepowiadanie sobie (1981) 
Konstancin (1991 – posthumously)

References

External links
  Polish Literature in English Translation: Miron Białoszewski
 Miron Białoszewski at Culture.pl
 Miron Białoszewski biography and poems at poezja.org
 The Kingdom of Insignificance: Miron Białoszewski and the Quotidian, the Queer, and the Traumatic
 A memoir of the Warsaw Uprising
 Post-war Polish Poetry
 Hybrid Humour: Comedy in Transcultural Perspectives
 The Historicity of Experience: Modernity, the Avant-Garde, and the Event
 Miron Bialoszewski: Radical Quest Beyond Dualisms

1922 births
1983 deaths
Burials at Powązki Cemetery
Gay novelists
Polish LGBT novelists
Polish LGBT poets
Polish LGBT dramatists and playwrights
Polish male novelists
Gay dramatists and playwrights
20th-century Polish novelists
20th-century Polish poets
20th-century Polish dramatists and playwrights
Polish male dramatists and playwrights
Polish male poets
20th-century Polish male writers
Gay poets
20th-century Polish LGBT people